John Gillis Townsend Jr. (May 31, 1871 – April 10, 1964) was an American businessman and politician from Selbyville in Sussex County, Delaware. He was a member of the Republican Party who served one term as Governor and two terms as U.S. Senator from Delaware.

Early life and family
Townsend was born in Bishopville, in Worcester County, Maryland, son of John Gillis Townsend and Mariedith Dukes Townsend. He married Jennie Collins, and they had seven children: John G. III, Jennie Thelma, Paul, Julia, Preston Coleman, Edith, and Lyla. His wife was killed in an automobile accident in 1919 while he was governor. They were members of the Methodist Church.

Professional and political career
When the railroad first came through Bishopville, Townsend learned telegraphy and was hired by the Pennsylvania Railroad. Soon he recognized the need for railroad ties, set up a sawmill to make them, and began selling them. In 1896, he moved his family to Selbyville, Delaware, where he began growing strawberries. Before long he was known as the "Strawberry King." To better manage his business he set up his own bank, the Baltimore Trust Company, which became the state's second-largest bank. Townsend, Inc. moved into poultry, corn and soybeans. By the time he died, it was one of the state's largest and most diversified agricultural businesses. He continued his businesses after entering politics and returned to their management when he was not in office.

Governor of Delaware
Townsend was elected to the Delaware House of Representatives and served one term during the 1903-04 session as a member of the Addicks, or Union Republican, faction of the Republican Party. He was elected Governor of Delaware in 1916 by defeating Democrat James H. Hughes, a lawyer from Dover, Delaware.

United States Senator
Townsend was elected to the U.S. Senate in 1928, defeating incumbent Democratic U.S. Senator Thomas F. Bayard Jr. and was reelected in 1934, defeating former Democratic U.S. Representative Wilbur L. Adams. Townsend lost his bid for a third term in 1940 to Democrat James M. Tunnell, a lawyer from Georgetown, Delaware.

In the 72nd Congress, he was chairman of the Committee to Audit and Control the Contingent Expenses. He was also a member of the Mount Rushmore National Memorial Commission in 1939 and 1940.

Death and legacy
Townsend died at age 92 in Philadelphia, and is buried in the Red Men's Cemetery at Selbyville.

"Townsend's administration was one of progressiveness and reform...all the major reforms of the 19th century came to maturity during this time: woman suffrage, new and better highways, prohibition, school reform, etc..."

Almanac
Elections are held the first Tuesday after November 1. Members of the Delaware General Assembly take office the second Tuesday of January. State representatives have a two-year term. The governor takes office the third Tuesday of January and has a four-year term. U.S. Senators are popularly elected and took office March 4 until 1935, when they began taking office January 3 for a six-year term.

Notes

References

Images
Biographical Directory of the United States Congress

External links

Biographical Directory of the Governors of the United States
Biographical Directory of the United States Congress
Delaware’s Governors 

The Political Graveyard 

1871 births
1964 deaths
People from Sussex County, Delaware
Businesspeople from Delaware
Republican Party members of the Delaware House of Representatives
Republican Party governors of Delaware
Republican Party United States senators from Delaware
People from Worcester County, Maryland